Southwark is a London Underground station in the London Borough of Southwark at the corner of Blackfriars Road and The Cut. It was opened on 20 November 1999 as part of the Jubilee Line Extension. The station is somewhat west of historic Southwark, which is served by Borough and London Bridge stations. Its entrance is across the road from the disused Blackfriars Road railway station.

The original plan for the Extension did not include a station between those at Waterloo and London Bridge; Southwark station was added after lobbying by the local council, it is in fact sited right next to the borough's boundary with Lambeth at Joan Street. Although it is close to Waterloo, not near the Bankside attractions it was intended to serve, and its only National Rail interchange is to  main line station; the passenger usage matches those of other minor central stations. It does however get over twice the traffic of nearby Borough station, and around three times that of Lambeth North.

History
Southwark station was designed by Sir Richard MacCormac of MJP Architects. It is on a cramped site, with its platforms underneath the Victorian main line viaduct between Waterloo East and London Bridge stations. The site presented significant technical and architectural difficulties which were resolved by constructing two concourses at different levels.

The two platforms have platform screen doors which are meant to prevent passengers or debris from falling onto the tracks. They are connected at each end to the lower concourse which is a simple tunnel between the platforms and is illuminated by glass and steel "beacons" at each end, and is faced with stainless steel panels, deliberately left unpolished. Stairs lead up to a section of high floor in the central area of the tunnel, from where three narrow tube-like escalator shafts lead sideways (south) to the higher concourse.

The upper concourse is the centrepiece of the station. The wall is one of the extension's more celebrated architectural features, winning critical approval and a number of awards.

MacCormac said the design of this and the lower concourse was inspired by the work of the 19th-century Prussian architect Karl Friedrich Schinkel.

One end of the higher concourse connects to Waterloo East station, and the other end to the station's modest low-rise entrance building which is intended as a base for a future commercial development.

Connections
London Buses routes 40, 63 and night routes N63 and N89 serve the station.

Gallery

Additional images of Southwark Underground Station, and an architectural case study, are available on the Commission for Architecture and the Built Environment (CABE) web site.

Nearby sights

 Shakespeare's Globe
 Young Vic theatre
 Old Vic theatre
 Tate Modern

References

Jubilee line stations
London Underground Night Tube stations
Tube stations in the London Borough of Southwark
Transport architecture in London
Railway stations in Great Britain opened in 1999
Richard MacCormac buildings